Oscar Nils Per Johansson (born 6 May 1995) is a Swedish professional footballer who plays as a midfielder for Allsvenskan club IFK Värnamo.

Club career
Johansson scored nine goals and made two assists through 30 matches in the 2017 Superettan for IFK Värnamo. In January 2018, Johansson signed a three-year contract with Trelleborgs FF. After the 2020 season, Johansson left the club.

In February 2021, Johansson returned to IFK Värnamo, where he signed a two-year contract. He won the 2021 Superettan with the team, reaching promotion to Allsvenskan.

Honours
IFK Värnamo
 Superettan: 2021

References

External links 
 
 

Swedish footballers
1995 births
Living people
Allsvenskan players
Superettan players
IFK Värnamo players
Trelleborgs FF players
Association football midfielders